Þórður Jónsson (29 November 1934 – 29 October 2018) was an Icelandic footballer. He played in 13 matches for the Iceland national football team from 1955 to 1962.

References

External links
 

1934 births
2018 deaths
Thordur Jonsson
Thordur Jonsson
Place of birth missing
Association footballers not categorized by position